Attilaea is a genus of flowering plants belonging to the family Anacardiaceae.

Its native range is Southeastern Mexico.

Species:

Attilaea abalak

References

Anacardiaceae
Anacardiaceae genera